Michel Oreste Lafontant (April 8, 1859 – October 29, 1918) served as president of Haiti from May 1913 to January 1914. He was a reformist toppled by forces loyal to landowner elites such as his successor Oreste Zamor. He died in exile in New York City on 28 October 1918.

External links

1859 births
1918 deaths
Presidents of Haiti
Haitian exiles
Haitian expatriates in the United States
People from Sud-Est (department)
Members of the Senate (Haiti)